Elections to the Manipur Legislative Assembly were held in February 2007, to elect members of the 60 constituencies in Manipur, India. The Indian National Congress won the most seats as well as the popular vote, and Okram Ibobi Singh was re-appointed as the Chief Minister of Manipur. The Indian National Congress was part of the Secular Proggresive Front alliance, along with the Communist Party of India, the Nationalist Congress Party and the Manipur State Congress Party.

After the passing of The Delimitation of Parliamentary and Assembly Constituencies Order, 1976, the constituencies were set to the ones used in this election.

Result

Elected Members

See also 
 List of constituencies of the Manipur Legislative Assembly
 2007 elections in India

References

Manipur
2007
2007